State Road 363 (SR 363) is a north–south route in the Big Bend region of Florida.

Route description
The road begins in St. Marks at Riverside Drive.  From there, the road progresses north, intersecting US 98 and State Road 267 before leaving Wakulla County.  In Leon County and approaching Tallahassee, the road intersects US 319 and CR 259.  Just north of CR 259, SR 363 shares a brief concurrency with State Road 61 before veering west one block of SR 61 and continuing north in Tallahassee, parraeeling SR 61 one block to the west.  It crosses the CSX Railroad tracks in downtown Tallahassee on the M. S. Thomas Bridge. For the last four blocks of the highway, SR 363 becomes a one way pair, ending at State Road 371 near the state capitol.

Major intersections

References

External links

363
363
363
Transportation in Tallahassee, Florida